Richard Throll (18 January 1880 – 12 March 1961) was a German painter and designer. The focus of his work was the design of interiors for which he also made furniture and works of art.

Life 
In 1905, he designed a villa at Leonrodstraße 4 ½ in Traunstein, which is still preserved in its original state. From 1905 to 1911, he was a teacher at the Berchtesgadener Fachschule and then professor at the Hochschule für Gestaltung Offenbach am Main. In 1912, he designed the rooms of the Budenheim Protestant parish, which were restored to their original state in 2008. In 1919, he painted the Offenbach Synagogue and also executed the stained glass windows and the Torah shrine. He also designed wine labels for the "Graphische Anstalt Wilhelm Gerstung" in Offenbach.

Throll died in Munich at the age of 81.

Further reading 
 Messerer, Ernst: Richard Throll, in "Bayerischer Kunstgewerbe-Verein" (ed.): Kunst und Handwerk: Zeitschrift für Kunstgewerbe und Kunsthandwerk, volume 62 (1911–1912), page 99ff. Heidelberg historic literature
 Entry in the matriculation database of the Academy of Fine Arts Munich

References 

19th-century German painters
19th-century German male artists
German designers
1880 births
1961 deaths
People from Munich
20th-century German painters
20th-century German male artists